Wishing or Wishin' may refer to:

 Wish, a hope or desire for something

Albums
 Wishing (A Flock of Seagulls album), 1996
 Wishing (Martine McCutcheon album), 2000

Songs
 "Wishing" (DJ Drama song), 2016
 "Wishing (If I Had a Photograph of You)", by A Flock of Seagulls, 1982
 "Wishing", by  Electric Light Orchestra from Discovery, 1979
 "Wishing", by Everclear from Invisible Stars, 2012
 "Wishing", by Irving Berlin
 "Wishin, by Eddy Howard, 1952
 "Wishin", by Mike McGear from Woman, 1972

See also
 Wishing well (disambiguation)